The Anne Arundel County Delegation refers to the members of the Maryland House of Delegates who reside in or represent legislative districts that are made of all or parts of Anne Arundel County, Maryland in the United States of America. Three delegates are elected from each district, though some districts are divided into sub-districts.

Authority and responsibilities
The Delegation is responsible for representing the interests, needs and concerns of the citizens of Anne Arundel County in the Maryland House of Delegates, the lower chamber of the Maryland General Assembly.

Members

See also
 Current members of the Maryland State Senate

References

External links
 Maryland General Assembly

Delegations in the Maryland General Assembly
Anne Arundel County, Maryland